Dinosaurs Don't Die is a 1970 British children's book, written by Ann Coates and illustrated by John Vernon Lord. It tells the story of a young boy, Daniel, who lives opposite the Sydenham Hill park in South London where the Crystal Palace was moved after the Great Exhibition. At night the boy notices that some of the Crystal Palace Dinosaurs, models created by sculptor Benjamin Waterhouse Hawkins, come to life. He befriends an Iguanodon whom he names "Rock".

Hawkins' models of the Iguanodon mistakenly portray the large thumb spike as a nose horn; also, the dinosaurs are shown as quadrupeds rather than bipeds and these mistakes are faithfully reproduced in the book. The book is no longer in print.

References

External links

 Photos of dinosaurs and houses depicted in Dinosaurs Don't Die

1970 British novels
1970 fantasy novels
British children's novels
Children's fantasy novels
Children's novels about dinosaurs
Novels set in London
1970 children's books